State Route 757 (SR 757) is a north–south state highway located in the central portion of the U.S. state of Ohio.  The highway runs from its southern terminus at SR 13 in Somerset to its northern terminus at a T-intersection with SR 204 in Glenford.

Route description
SR 757 runs exclusively within northern Perry County.  The highway is not included as a portion of the National Highway System.

History
By 1957, the southern portion of SR 757 was re-aligned onto the routing that it follows today from the Black Horse Road intersection southeasterly to its intersection with SR 13 in Somerset.

Major intersections

References

757
Transportation in Perry County, Ohio